Bangladesh Institute of Islamic Thought (BIIT) is a research-oriented think-tank situated in Bangladesh and is registered with the International Institute of Islamic Thought, based in Washington, United States. BIIT is engaged in research and in-depth studies for synthesizing education, culture & ethics. It was established in the year 1989 and presently functions as a registered non-government organization.

Leadership 
Shah Abdul Hannan, a notable Bangladeshi intellectual, is a co-founder of the institute and currently serves as the head of the BIIT Trust.

Location and services 

The divisional offices of the institute are located Chittagong, Rajshahi and Kushtia. The institution has a well resourced library.

Publication 
The institute regularly publishes books and translated works from Islamic scholars of other languages such as Arabic and English. It publishes a semiannual journal called Bangladesh Journal of Islamic Thought (BJIT) in English and Bengali.

See also
 Islam in Bangladesh

References

External links 
 BIIT website

Islamic organisations based in Bangladesh
Think tanks based in Bangladesh